Prince Charles Belgique Hollande de La Trémoïlle (May 1655 – 1 June 1709), 4th Duke of Thouars, was a French nobleman.

Early life
He was the second child and eldest son of Prince Henri Charles de La Trémoille (son and heir of Prince Henri de La Trémoille, 3rd Duke of Thouars and his wife Princess Marie de La Tour d'Auvergne of Bouillon) and his wife Princess Emilie of Hesse-Kassel (daughter of Prince William V, Prince of Hesse-Kassel and his wife Countess Amalie Elisabeth of Hanau-Münzenberg).

Religion
Brought up a Calvinist, in 1668 his father had converted to Catholicism and then forcibly converted his children as well. His mother and eldest sister fled to the Netherlands.

Marriage and issue
On 3 April 1675 he married Princess Madeleine de Créquy (1655-1707), daughter and heiress of Prince Charles de Créquy and his wife Anne-Armande de Saint Gelais de Lansac. The couple had two children:
 Princess Marie Armande de La Trémoille (1677-1717) who married Prince Emmanuel Théodose de La Tour d'Auvergne of Bouillon, The Prince of Turenne (later Reigning Duke of Bouillon from 1721); They had Seven children.
 
 Prince Charles Louis Bretagne de La Trémoille who succeeded him as The 5th Duke of Thouars as well as other titles in 1709; He married Marie-Madeleine Motier de La Fayette and they had one child.

Ancestors

External links

1655 births
1709 deaths
French nobility
House of La Trémoille
French princes
Dukes of Thouars
Dukes of La Trémoille
Counts of France
French Roman Catholics
Converts to Roman Catholicism from Calvinism
17th-century French people
18th-century French people
17th-century peers of France
18th-century peers of France
People of Byzantine descent
Dukes of France